The Latvia national beach soccer team represents Latvia in international beach soccer competitions and is controlled by the LFF, the governing body for football in Latvia.

Current squad

 

Coach: Valts Būmanis

European national beach soccer teams
B